The trilling tapaculo (Scytalopus parvirostris) is a species of bird in the family Rhinocryptidae. It is found in Bolivia and Peru.

Taxonomy and systematics

The trilling tapaculo was previously considered a subspecies of unicolored tapaculo (Scytalopus unicolor) but was elevated to species status based on differences in their vocalizations. Though it is monophyletic, there are song variations in different parts of its range that suggest that there might be undefined subspecies.

Description

Males weigh  and females . Adult males are usually dark gray above and lighter gray below, though sometimes dark gray all over. The flanks and crissum (the area around the cloaca) are dark reddish brown with dusky bars. The female is similar to the male but paler with a dark brown wash. The juvenile is similar to the female with the addition of a scaly appearance due to yellowish edges to feathers.

Distribution and habitat

The trilling tapaculo is found on the east slope of the Andes from southern Amazonas, Peru, southeastward to western Santa Cruz in Bolivia.

Behavior

Feediing

The trilling tapaculo forages in dense undergrowth alone or in pairs, on or near the ground. Its diet has not been studied.

Breeding

No information is available other than that a juvenile was collected in July.

Vocalization

The trilling tapaculo's song gives it its name. The trill's pace varies geographically, at 21 notes per second in central Peru , 14 in southern Peru , and 20 to 28 in Bolivia . Its scold is similar but shorter  and it also has a single-note call .

Status

The IUCN has assessed the trilling tapaculo as being of Least Concern. It has a large range, and though its population has not been quantified it is believed to be fairly large and stable.

References

trilling tapaculo
Birds of the Peruvian Andes
Birds of the Bolivian Andes
trilling tapaculo
trilling tapaculo
Taxonomy articles created by Polbot